Marino Baldini (born 12 July 1963 in Poreč) is a member of the Social Democratic Party of Croatia and at the 2013 European Parliament election in Croatia was elected as one of the new Croatian members of the European Parliament.

He is a Master of Social Services, archaeology and art.

Following the accession of Croatia to the European Union in 2013, Baldini was placed on the Parliament's Committee of Economic and Monetary Affairs.

References

External links
Twitter feed
Marino Baldini profile at the European Parliament

1963 births
Living people
People from Poreč
Social Democratic Party of Croatia politicians
Foreign ministers of Croatia
MEPs for Croatia 2013–2014